Vague Us is a 2001 album by the Welsh indie rock band Mo-Ho-Bish-O-Pi. The album received generally positive reviews, The Independent stating that "this trio's energy and diversity make for something that's really rather exciting". Fraser Middleton writes in the Glasgow Evening Times that "there is a glorious abandon to Mo*Ho*Bish*Op*I which is really refreshing. Vague Us sounds like the album the band desperately wanted to make, rather than one the record company or producer manipulated out of them".

Track listing
 Maverick
 Vague Us
 Fista Blista
 Kids On Cake
 Hear The Air
 Drop Jaw
 Over SeXXXed
 E To C
 Playboy
 Moment To Soon
 Push
 Names (For Nameless Things)
 All Your Health
 Navel In A Suitcase
 Harpers

References

External links
[ Vague Us] on AllMusic

2001 albums
Mo-Ho-Bish-O-Pi albums